The Sleepover Club was an Australian television series that was produced by Andy Rowley for Wark Clements and Burberry Production in association with Rialto Films, with the assistance of the Pacific Film and Television Commission for Netflix, ITV, Yey!, Nickelodeon and the Nine Network. It is distributed internationally by Southern Star Sales. It was adopted from The Sleepover Club novel series. It ran from 12 November 2003 to 21 March 2008.

Overview

Series one
Frankie with her four best friends Fliss, Kenny, Lyndz and Rosie are part of the sleepover club, where each member holds sleepovers. The five-members strong club deals with every-day problems. The main antagonists are called the M&Ms, made up of three members (Matthew, Marco and Michael) who always try to interfere with the girls' lives (or whose lives are interfered with by the SOC). The club is also targeted by two posh girls Sara and Alana who always try to join the club or disband it.

Main characters
 Francesca "Frankie" Thomas (Caitlin Stasey) is the leader of the sleepover club. In the first few episodes, Frankie takes an immediate disliking to Rosie, the newest member of the group even though the other girls get along great with her. Frankie is loyal to the club, adventurous, determined but also bossy, as seen in several episodes. She is an only child who lives with her parents, and she longs for a sibling. It is revealed that Frankie dreams of becoming an actress. She has a dog, Max, and secretly has a blanket she named Woozey. Her best friend is Kenny. She secretly has a crush on Matthew, who is one of the M&Ms. Her mother becomes pregnant in episode 23 – "The Price of Success". Her favorite color is purple. In episode 4 – "Fearlotto", her fear is blood.
 Felicity "Fliss" Sidebotham (Ashleigh Chisholm), is a young fashion enthusiast who's obsessed with her appearance. She was known as the bubbly fashionista and also she has a crush on her fellow student Ryan Scott. Fliss' parents are divorced and she no longer sees her father. Her mother remarries in the last episode of series one. She has a younger brother called Callum, who was bullied in one episode and hates the Sleepover Club. She can be shallow and self-centered. Her favorite color is pink. In episode 4 – "Fearlotto", her fear is public humiliation.
 Kendra "Kenny" Tan (Hannah Wang) is the athletic member of the club. She is Chinese-Australian and hopes to manage Manchester United F.C. when she is older, as it is her favorite team. She takes part in all sorts of physical activities from soccer to athletics. In episode 13, she moves to Sydney after her father was offered a job promotion. Kenny is a natural-born leader is always there for her friends. She lives with her sister (whom she doesn't get on well with) her mother, father and grandmother. Her favorite color is orange. In the book series, her name was Laura McKenzie. In episode 4 – "Fearlotto", her fear is heights.
 Lyndsey "Lyndz" Collins (Basia A'Hern) is the fourth member of the club, and like Rosie she is also from England. Although she has shown to be short-tempered at times, she is considered to be the nicest member of the group. She is passionate about animals, especially horses. Lyndz tries her best to fit in and at times has low self-esteem. It has been mentioned that when she is older, she wants to run a horse riding school as she is an avid rider. She has a fraternal twin brother, Michael, who is one of the M&Ms and she also has an older brother, Tom. Her favorite color is green. In episode 4 – "Fearlotto", her fear is bats but later overcomes this.
 Rosie Cartwright (Eliza Taylor) is an aspiring writer and journalist from England. She wants to take after her father, as he is a journalist. She was the last girl to join the SOC, in episode two. She is the smartest of the girls and can be quite brash. Her mother died and she lives with her father, David, and her brother, Will. She has a crush on Lyndz's brother, Tom. She is the "problem solver" of the group. Her favorite color is yellow. In episode 4 – "Fearlotto", her fear is sharks.

Recurring characters
 Matthew McDougal (Ryan Corr) is the leader of the M&Ms, a group of boys. His mother is a friend of Fliss' mother, so they often see each other which provides a chance to spy on her and the club activities. He is a friend of Fliss' younger brother, Callum. It is implied he has a crush on Frankie.
 Marco de Peiri (Stefan La Rosa) is the friendliest member of the M&Ms, who sometimes gives away the boy's plans. Later, Marco has a growing interest in Fliss, and is secretly a nice guy.
 Michael Collins (Blake Hampson) is Lyndsey's twin brother and a member of the M&Ms. Michael has occasional fleeting moments of goodness.
 Sara (Annaleise Woods) is dedicated to disbanding the Sleepover Club. She is in the same class as Frankie and her friends. She is known as Sara Tiara to the Sleepover Club members.
 Alana (Ashleigh Brewer) is the lackey friend of Sara. The Sleepover Club members call her Alana Banana. She isn't really intelligent and agrees with whatever Sara says.
 Ryan Scott (Craig Marriott) is Fliss' longtime crush. In Fliss' mind, Ryan is her future husband. She plans to have two children with him, Ryan Jr. and Ryanna. He is friends with Wolf and Dim.
 Mr. Stephanopolous (Vince D'Amico) is the owner of the legendary Beach Hut Café. The SOC, the M&Ms and Sara & Alana all hang out there. In one episode, he almost closes the Beach Hut for good, but the SOC saves it. He has a niece named Nina. The SOC calls him Mr. S. He is very funny and has a childlike nature.

Series two
Three years after Series one, Frankie (now 16) is forced to move away from her home town after her father receives a job promotion, and she takes with her the Sleepover Club book. Due to complications, she stays with her cousin for a week. There she discovers her cousin Charlie struggling to balance her social life with her four best friends. She entrusts Charlie with a new sleepover club book as Charlie, Tayla, Maddy, Jess and Brooke form a sleepover club. The main antagonists are called "The Blockheads" consisting of Jason, Simon and Declan who with the aid of Krystal and Caitlin try to meddle with the clubs affairs.

Main characters
 Charlotte "Charlie" Anderson (Morgan Griffin) is the leader of the second generation of the Sleepover Club. Charlie and Maddy have been best friends since kindergarten. Charlie is an only child and lives with her two loving parents. She and Frankie are cousins. When she is older she hopes to become a journalist. It is implied that she has a crush on Jason. She was inspired by Frankie of season one.
 Tayla Kane (Rachel Watson) is not the smartest of the girls. She loves the colour pink. She is very fashion-conscious and always listens to her psychic phone pal, Zodiac Zoey. She lives with her younger sister and her parents. She was inspired by Fliss of season one.
 Madeline "Maddy" Leigh (Emanuelle Bains) is the very competitive and sporty one of the group. Her main interests are basketball and surfing and she always wants to win. Maddy is also known to be very smart and good in science. She has been best friends with Charlie since kindergarten. She was inspired by Kenny of season one.
 Jessica "Jess" Philips (Monique Williams) is the artsy and shy one of the group. Of African-Australian descent, she lives with her parents and older brother, Zac. She and Brooke are best friends. She was inspired by Rosie of season one.
 Brooke Webster (Katie Nazer-Hennings) enjoys photography and knows a lot about computers. She is very knowledgeable and loves animals. She has a stepbrother named Simon who is one of the Blockheads. She and Jess are best friends. She was inspired by Lyndz of season one.

Recurring characters
 Jason Block (James Bell) is the brains of the Blockheads, and is always thinking of a plan to benefit himself. Jason is the enemy of the Sleepover Club. Jason and Charlie used to be best friends as kids because they are neighbours. He also has a crush on Charlie, but tries to hide it by irritating her and the rest of the Sleepover Club girls. Inspired by Matthew from season 1
 Declan (Shannon Lively) is Jason's second henchman. Not the smartest, mostly just tags along because it's something to do. Inspired by Marco from season 1.
 Simon Webster (Nathan Coenen) is the main deceiver out of the three as he always goes with his step sister, Brooke's, mind rather than Jason's. He gets the gossip from Brooke to relay to Jason. Inspired by Michael of season 1.
 Krystal Beasley (Julia O'Connor ) is always trying to learn the Sleepover Clubs secrets and asks Caitlin to do so. Secretly everyone at school calls her 'Beastley'. She is also an only child and extremely spoilt. She is very bossy and rude, but can sometimes be an ally to the Sleepover Club girls to get revenge on the boys. Jason said that she thinks she's always important. Inspired by Sara of season one.
 Caitlin (Ruby Hall) is the loyal best friend of Krystal Beasley. Caitlin has a lovely personality, but is always being led astray by Krystal and is constantly doing her bidding. The Sleepover Club girls often pity Caitlin when Krystal's bossing her about with particular force. Inspired by Alana of season one.

Episodes

Production and filming
 The original series was produced at Varsity College in Gold Coast, Queensland, Australia and post produced by Cutting Edge Gold Coast and Brisbane. The glorious beaches and attractive beach side homes were a major feature of the series which featured the famous M&M's in various shore side exploits.
 The second season was filmed in and around Western Australia's Perth Metropolitan area at locations such as the Fremantle Jail (no longer in service, but now a major tourist attraction), the Sunset Men's home (turned Psychiatric Hospital, also no longer in use), Churchlands Senior High School and Hillary's boat harbour as well as at other various locations.

Broadcast Australia history 
Nine Network (12 November 2003 – 26 March 2007)

Broadcast UK history 
CITV (2004) 
Nickelodeon (2004–2008) 
Pop Girl (2009–2013)

Australia VHS history 
Village Roadshow Australia (2004)

Media and DVDs
Both seasons of The Sleepover Club have been released on DVD. Besides numerous volumes, the first season was released in 2007 and contains all 26 episodes of the first season, and the second season was released in August 2007 and contains all 26 episodes of the second season.

Australia VHS releases 
Village Roadshow Australia (2004)

References

External links
 The Sleepover Club at the Australian Television Information Archive
 

2002 Australian television series debuts
2008 Australian television series endings
ITV children's television shows
Australian comedy-drama television series
Australian children's television series
Television series by Endemol Australia
Nine Network original programming
English-language television shows
Television shows featuring audio description
Television series about teenagers
Television shows set in Gold Coast, Queensland
Television shows set in Perth, Western Australia